Nêdong District is a district of Shannan in the Tibet Autonomous Region of China.

Tradruk Temple, an important early Buddhist monastery dating to the reign of Songtsen Gampo, is located in the Yarlung Valley in Nêdong as is Yungbulakang Palace.

Counties of Tibet
Shannan, Tibet